Blind Dates is a 2013 Georgian drama film directed by Levan Koguashvili. It was screened in the Contemporary World Cinema section at the 2013 Toronto International Film Festival. It also won the Best Feature Film award at the 2014 Zagreb Film Festival.

Cast
 Kakhi Kavsadze
 Andro Sakvarelidze as Sandro
 Ia Sukhitashvili as Manana

References

External links
 

2013 films
2013 drama films
2010s Georgian-language films
Drama films from Georgia (country)